Fominskoye is a rural locality (a selo) in Biysk, Altai Krai, Russia. The population was 1,273 as of 2013. There are 56 streets.

Geography 
Fominskoye is located 31 km southwest of Biysk (the district's administrative centre) by road. Odintsovka is the nearest rural locality.

References 

Rural localities in Biysk Urban Okrug